Gonglang is a town in Nanjian Yi Autonomous County, Yunnan, China. It is known as "Hometown of Tea", "Hometown of Walnut", and "Hometown of Citron".

Administrative division
As of 2018, the town is divided into fourteen villages: 
Xinhe
Zhongshan
Dime
Fenghuang
Fengling
Huiying
Gonglang
Longping
Jinshan
Banqiao
Guandi
Shale
Ziqiang
Luodihe

History
The first dynasty to rule Gonglang was the Tang dynasty (618–907), beginning in the 7th century. It came under the jurisdiction of Langcang Xunjiansi in mid-Ming dynasty (1368–1644). In 1729, in the ruling of Yongzheng Emperor of the Qing dynasty (1644–1911), it was under the jurisdiction of Jingmeng.

In 1914, the Nanjian Xunjiansi was set up. In 1940, Langcang Town was formed.

During the Great Leap Forward, it was renamed "Gonglang Commune" in 1958. It was incorporated as a township in 1988. In 2000, Langcang Township was revoked and Gonglang was upgraded to a town.

Geography
It lies at the southwestern of Nanjian Yi Autonomous County, bordering the towns of Wuliangshan, Xiaowandong, Baohua, townships of Bixi and Yongcui, Yun County, Fengqing County, and Jingdong Yi Autonomous County.

Economy
The town's main industries are agriculture. Economic crops are mainly tea, walnut, and potato.

Demographics

As of 2020, the National Bureau of Statistics of China estimates the town's population now to be 32,719.

Tourist attractions
The Jade Emperor Pavilion is a Taoist temple in the town, and the Guanyin Hall is a Buddhist temple. The Land God Temple is a temple of folk belief for Yi people. The Gonglang Mosque was originally built in the Jiaqing period of the Qing dynasty (1644–1911).

Transportation
he National Highway G214 passes across the town north to south.

References

Bibliography

Divisions of Nanjian Yi Autonomous County